The 1998 Belgian Cup Final, took place on 16 May 1998 between Genk and Club Brugge. It was the 43rd Belgian Cup final. Genk played their first Cup final ever and took a convincing victory, by four goals to nil.

Route to the final

Match

Details

External links
  
 RSSSF Belgium Cups 1997/98

Belgian Cup finals
Cup Final